Cedar Creek High School is a public high school located in Cedar Creek, Texas, United States, and classified as a 5A school by the University Interscholastic League (UIL). It is part of the Bastrop Independent School District in Bastrop County and is the district's second high school. Cedar Creek opened with just freshmen and sophomores in the fall of 2010.  Cedar Creek High School celebrated its second graduating class in 2014 with over 200 graduates. In 2015, the school was rated "Met Standard" by the Texas Education Agency.

Communities served
Communities served by the school: Cedar Creek, Red Rock, Rockne, and Wyldwood.

Campus
Facilities Description:
 1500 student capacity (with plan for future expansion to 2300 students)
 Competition gym, practice gym, field house and locker rooms
 Cafetorium with stage
 Fine arts facilities including band hall, drama, choir, dance, visual arts
 "Main Street" common areas including offices, library/media center, student services, and Career and Technology classes
 Four academic learning communities with satellite offices, common areas and teacher workrooms
 Football field, softball field, baseball field, soccer field, eight tennis courts

Athletics
The Cedar Creek Eagles compete in these sports - 

Baseball
Basketball
Cross Country
Football
Golf
Powerlifting
Soccer
Softball
Tennis
Track and Field
Volleyball

Clubs and Organizations
The Cedar Creek Eagles compete and participate in the following clubs:

The Anime Club, Art Club, Ballet Folklorico, Cedar Creek FFA (CCHS FFA), Chess Club, Debate Club, Fellowship of Christian Athletes (FCA), Gay Straight Alliance (GSA), Health Occupation Students of America (HOSA), Interact club, Multicultural Club, National Honor Society (NHS), President's Board (P2), Rhapsody in Blue Show Choir, Robotics Club, Student Council, Superintendent Student Advisory Committee (SSAC), and the Thespian Society. New clubs are frequently added as niches are found.

Former Clubs and Organizations
The following clubs were officially recognized and operational at one time, but have since disbanded or are no longer operational:

The Cedar Creek Eagle Editorial (C2E2) Newspaper, Eagle Royal, The Shack (fine dining society) and Swim Team (rest in peace).

Gallery

References

External links

Bastrop ISD
Official Twitter Page
Cedar Creek Cross Country
Cedar Creek Athletic Booster Club

Schools in Bastrop County, Texas
Public high schools in Texas